HD 76151 is a high proper motion, G-type main sequence star (G3/ 5 V or yellow star) in the constellation of Hydra 56.70 light years from earth.  It has an apparent visual magnitude of approximately 6.00. An infrared excess has been detected around this star, most likely indicating the presence of a circumstellar disk at a radius of 7.9 AU. The temperature of this dust is 99 K. 

HD 76151 has an estimated age of 7.10 billion years old with some estimates of HD 76151 being as young as 3.10 to 11.00 according to hipparcos. The star is around 5000-6000 degrees Kelvin. The radius of HD 76151 is 716,586.05 kilometers.

References

Hydra (constellation)
G-type main-sequence stars
0327
076151
043726
3538
Durchmusterung objects